Iraqi Lesbian, Gay, Bisexual, and Trans (LGBT) activism refers to any work done to advance the state of LGBT peoples in political, cultural, or home safety. The Iraq government has maintained an anti-LGBT stance since gaining independence in 1932 where homosexuality was officially banned. This would be expanded in the IRCC Resolution 234 of 2001 which would punish sodomy, or any homosexual act, with the death penalty. Due to harsh stigma against people who are LGBT, many activist organizations find themselves at a crossroads of whether to focus on building tolerance in Iraq, or instead focusing on ensuring safety or asylum for the LGBT communities.

History

Kingdom of Iraq
On 3 October 1932 Britain granted Iraq independence, and one of the first laws that passed was the banning of homosexuality.

Republic and Ba'athist Iraq
In 1958, The 14 July Revolution, known as the 1958 Iraqi coup d'état, brought an end to a monarchy and established a brand new government. During this regime, LGBT people found a new voice, and greater visibility of LGBT people were making it into the mainstream culture. This is seen most in Baghdad between the end of the Iran-Iraq War in 1988 and the Iraqi invasion of Kuwait in August 1990, where scenes depicting gay men became more affluent, as well as female hormones being freely available in many Iraqi pharmacies.

This increase in freedoms would slowly begin to fade late into the Saddam regime as he gained more power over the Iraq government. A cultural shift started to form, with an emphasis on conservative values that glorified military action, and masculinity. There has been no evidence of organized violence against LGBT people before 2003 invasion.

U.S. presence 2003–2007 
Starting in 2003, a large spike in Anti-LGBT violence can be seen, with many people outside of the LGBT community, ranging from journalist, citizens, and even some politicians in Iraq, reporting how brutal many of the attacks were. It is around this time that many LGBT activist organizations, such as The Organization of Women's Freedom in Iraq and Iraqi LGBT, started to form in response to the growing violence. The largest amounts of murder and death would happen during this time period, and despite the formation of many LGBT activist organization, many would be forced to disband, go underground, or travel to different countries to continue work there.

2008–present 
The war's end in 2008, saw a decrease in violence for people's daily lives, and this allowed a surge in nightlife, including gay nightlife, in Baghdad, Basra, Najaf, and other cities for people in the LGBT community. This, however, also came with sadrist militiamen, part of the Mahdi Army, to reposition themselves to killing people who identify as homosexual.

According to a New York Times story in April 2009, Shiʿi clerics in Baghdad "devoted a portion of Friday Prayer services to inveighing against homosexuality." This emboldened many a people, and saw that the increase of LGBT activity, slowed down significantly.

Early 2012 saw the saw a large wave of killings done to "emo" people, and would later be called the "Emo Killings". These killings were done by Mahdi Army, and were largely criticized as needless acts of violence. Many Shi'i clerics, as well as the chairperson of the human rights committee of the Iraqi parliament, denounced these killings, though were also against emo culture as a whole.

Current activist organization

Rasan organization 
The first pro LGBT+ organization to formally and legally operate in Iraq is Rasan organization. The organization is operating in Sulaymaniyah, located in Iraqi Kurdistan. The organization was initially a feminist women's' rights organization when it was established in 2004, but then started working for LGBT+ people in 2016 as partners of COC Nederland in a project called "Pride Program" (called Crossing Iraqi Rainbow locally in Iraq).

The work began by a campaign which consisted of painting murals around the city of Sulaymaniyah, where the organization's base is located. Amongst the works done, a lot of the murals represented the LGBT+ community and had rainbows and other symbols that were associated with the community. Some of the murals consisted of same-sex couples with "love is love" messages written under them. Although there are other organization that are working for the LGBT+ community, Rasan is the only organization publicly supporting the community in Iraq as a whole, with a focus on the Kurdish population.

The Organization of Women’s Freedom in Iraq (OWFI)
The OWFI started in 2003 and has a focus on ensuring pioneering work to rebuild Iraq with secular democracy and human rights for all. Following the battles for Mosul and other nearby cities against ISIS, over 3 million people have found themselves displaced, with 10 million needing humanitarian aid, OWFI spearheaded an organized effort to change Iraq's Anti-Shelter Policy, which only allowed government run shelters to exist. OWFI led over 40 different local organization to change these policies, and expand the basic civil liberties of people in the region.

Iraqueer 
Iraqueer formed in March 2015 with LGBT+ members all over Iraq as the second organization supporting LGBT+ followed by Rasan, with the express goal of raising the awareness level among and about LGBT+ identities in the Iraqi society, and to advocate for LGBT+ rights in Iraq. Iraqueer has three main methods of achieving its goal, by providing education, advocacy, and direct services. In terms of education, Iraqueer has published several guides ranging from security to health safety along with the novel Living in The Margins, containing LGBT stories from people living in Iraq. They also upload videos to YouTube that talk about the different aspects of being an LGBT individual in Iraq. Finally, they host several workshops dedicated to teaching people about gender and sexuality, how to lobby and properly advocate, and to maintain safety and security in times of crisis. Iraqueer has submitted several reports international bodies, including the United Nations, talking about the state of LGBT people in Iraq.

Iraqi LGBT 
Iraqi LGBT is an LGBT rights organization, establish in September 2005, that was created in response to the rise in violence against LGBT people. Their main goal is the creation and maintenance of several different "safe houses" in Iraq, where people who are fleeing from prosecution can find protection and safety. Though they have done activist work promoting tolerance in Iraq, Iraqi LGBT focuses on relocating LGBT people to safer countries, and providing legal help for the LGBT people seeking asylum.

International Railroad for Queer Refugees 
Founded in 2008, International Railroad for Queer Refugees (IRQR)  provides financial and resettlement assistance for LGBT asylum seekers who are fleeing their homes because of prosecution for their sexual orientation, or gender identity. They also provide assistance and workshops for local organizations, so they can be better prepared in dealing with legal and social ramifications, as well as maintaining a network with different organizations so information can be spread easily, and not be intercepted by government officials.

National backlash 
Starting in 2003 with the rise of religious conservatism in the Iraq government, many media outlets began to publish articles and think pieces that condemned queer and LGBT people as practices of Satanism that contradict Islamic precepts and human nature. Major killings that targeted LGBT people began during this time, though the killings done in 2004 would not be discovered until later on due to the large amount of violence already occurring in the region. The people responsible for the killings would be linked to the Iran-backed Badr Corps, which form part of the Islamic Supreme Council of Iraq (ISCI).

In 2005, on Grand Ayatollah Ali al-Sistani's website, a fatwa, or a ruling on a point of Islamic law, was issued that declared the killing of homosexual men justified. It would be later taken down due to protests by advocate groups. Many international viewers saw this as one main causes in the rise of anti-LGBT violence, the Human Rights Watch saw little correlation between the fatwa and the violence.

The Mahdi Army formed again in 2009, and using the LGBT community as proof that the militia is needed to cleanse Iraq of undesirable people. The method used most often to succeed in their goals was to kill LGBT people. This would go on to be known as the killing campaigns. The militia justified their actions by citing that the killings were done for a moral cause that was meant to protect masculinity and traditional values. During the height of these killings, magazines and newspapers like Al-Esbuyia and Al-Sabah would publish pieces that supported the killings, and called for more action to stop the "feminization of men".

International intervention

International law 
In 1971, Iraq ratified the International Covenant on Civil and Political Rights (ICCPR) treaty, which placed a mandate on Iraqi officials to act against actions done to antagonize or oppress protected and minority groups, among these civil and political rights include; The Right to Life and Security, Protection Against Torture and Inhuman and Degrading Treatment, and The Guarantee of Non-Discrimination. Iraq has continuously violated these rights, and although the UN Human Rights Committee has condemned Iraq for violating the treaty, it has not faced any major consequences because of it.

See also 
 LGBT history in Iraq
 LGBT in Islam
 LGBT rights in the Middle East

References 

LGBT rights in Iraq